Hampden Park railway station serves Hampden Park in the northern areas of the seaside town of Eastbourne in East Sussex. It is on the East Coastway Line, and train services are provided by Southern. Opened on 1 January 1888, it was originally called Willingdon, but was renamed Hampden Park for Willingdon on 1 July 1903. The name became Hampden Park under British Railways. It is one of two stations serving Eastbourne, the other being Eastbourne railway station

The station is located on a spur line originally termed the Eastbourne Branch. There was a rarely used triangular junction between Polegate and the now-closed Stone Cross which allowed trains to bypass the Branch; the track has now been lifted. Services along the coast have almost invariably served Eastbourne, and as Eastbourne is at the end of the spur line, the trains pass through Hampden Park station twice - once on the way to Eastbourne, and once on the way out of Eastbourne - although not all trains stop on both occasions.
Because of this arrangement, some connections are advertised to allow passengers on the Victoria-Eastbourne service to use Hampden Park to pick up the stopping service to Hastings and vice versa.

The level crossing at Hampden Park is thought to be one of the busiest in the country, with an average of sixteen train movements an hour off-peak, and this can lead to significant traffic congestion on adjacent roads. The signal box which controlled the crossing was abolished in February 2015 when the controls were transferred to Three Bridges Regional Operations Centre.

Services 

The typical Monday-Friday off-peak service pattern is:

2tph to London Victoria (of which one stops here before Eastbourne and one stops after Eastbourne);
1tph to Brighton (stopping both before and after Eastbourne);
1tph to Hastings (stopping before Eastbourne);
2tph to Ore (stopping after Eastbourne);
1tph to Ashford International (stopping after Eastbourne);
2tph to Eastbourne only.

From May 2023 there will be 2tph off-peak between Brighton and Eastbourne, with 1tph continuing to Ore

References

External links

Buildings and structures in Eastbourne
Railway stations in East Sussex
DfT Category E stations
Former London, Brighton and South Coast Railway stations
Railway stations in Great Britain opened in 1888
Railway stations served by Govia Thameslink Railway